The Dickson River is a river of Chile.

See also
List of rivers of Chile

References
 EVALUACION DE LOS RECURSOS HIDRICOS SUPERFICIALES EN LA CUENCA DEL RIO BIO BIO

Rivers of Chile